Deh Now-e Jahangir Khan (also Romanized as Deh Now-e Jahāngīr Khān; also known as Deh Now and Deh Now-e Feyẕābād) is a village in Azadegan Rural District, in the Central District of Rafsanjan County, Kerman Province, Iran. At the 2006 census, its population was 45, in 11 families.

References 

Populated places in Rafsanjan County